This is a list of people connected to the Republic of Belarus. It is not limited to persons of Belarusian ethnicity; Russians, Jews, Poles, Vikings, etc., may be found in this list. Over time the Belarusian land has had many rulers, and often its culture was suppressed. Therefore, many Belarusian nationals are known to the world as Poles or Russians.

Culture 
Hanna Ipatava
Louis B. Mayer
Solomon Mikhoels
Hanna Rovina (1893–1980), Israeli actress
J. Michael Straczynski

Artists

Marc Chagall
Kirk Douglas
Petr Elfimov
Naum Gabo, sculptor
Michel Kikoine
Dmitry Koldun
Pinchus Kremegne
Yehudi Menuhin
Mikhail Savitsky
Chaïm Soutine
Sergey Voychenko
Ossip Zadkine

Composers
Irving Berlin
Vladimir Dukelsky
Napoleon Orda

Singers
Bianka
Valeria Gribusova
Alyona Lanskaya
Alexander Rybak
Teo

Writers

Ales Adamovich
Svetlana Alexievich
Guillaume Apollinaire, Belarusian mother
Isaac Asimov
Maksim Bahdanovich
Francishak Bahushevich
Janka Bryl
Vasil Bykau
Vintsent Dunin-Martsinkyevich
Avraham Even-Shoshan (1906–1984), Israeli linguist and lexicographer
Nil Hilevich
Nicolai Hussoviani
Uladzimir Karatkevich
Hienadz Kliauko
Yakub Kolas
Janka Kupala
John Lettou
Oleg Manaev
Vera Maslovskaya, poet
Janka Maur
Ivan Melezh
Alexander S. Potupa
Ryhor Reles
Mendele Mocher Sforim, founder of modern Yiddish and modern Hebrew literature
Ivan Shamiakin
Maksim Tank

Business

Leonard and Phil Chess
Ralph Lauren, his family immigrated from Pinsk, Belarus
Michael Marks
Louis B. Mayer
Alexander S. Potupa
David Sarnoff
Gary Vaynerchuk
Ruslan Kogan

State, revolution, military, politics 

Nadezhda Abramova
Menachem Begin, Prime Minister of Israel
Eliezer Ben-Yehuda
Catherine Breshkovsky
Stanislau Bulak-Balachovitch
Faddei Bulgarin
Chiang Fang-liang
Anatoly Chubais
David Dubinsky
Andrei Gromyko
Isser Harel, head of the Israeli Mossad
Vyacheslav Kebich
Tadeusz Kościuszko
Alexander Lukashenko
Alaksandar Milinkievič
Valeria Novodvorskaya
Nasta Palazhanka, activist
Alexander Parvus
Dmitri Pavlichenko
Zyanon Paznyak
Shimon Peres, Prime Minister and President of Israel
Alexander S. Potupa
Rogneda of Polotsk
Lev Sapieha
Yitzhak Shamir
Zalman Shazar, President of Israel
Stanislav Shushkevich
Sergey Sidorsky
Siarhei Skrabets
Chaim Weizmann, President of Israel

Scholars
Yefim Karsky
Uladzimir Konan
Raphael Lemkin
Moisey Ostrogorsky
Leon Petrażycki
Lev Vygotsky

Religion

Cyril of Turaŭ
Euphrosyne of Polatsk
Jazafat Kuncevič
Shneur Zalman of Liadi, Rabbi and Founder of Chabad-Lubavitch Hasidic movement
Menachem Mendel Schneersohn, the Tzemach Tzedek, 3rd Lubavitcher Rebbe
Yisrael Meir Kagan, famous 19th century Rabbi (Chofetz Chaim)
Joseph Lookstein, Rabbi and President of Bar-Ilan University

Science
Zhores Ivanovich Alferov, Nobel Prize laureate
Yury Bandazhevsky
Alexander Bogdanov
Symon Budny
Morris Raphael Cohen, Jewish philosopher
Ignacy Domeyko, geologist
Valery Fabrikant, mechanical engineer, mass murderer
Konstanty Jelski, ornithologist and zoologist
Berl Katznelson
Pyotr Klimuk, cosmonaut
Elena Korosteleva, political scientist
Semyon Ariyevich Kosberg
Vladimir Kovalyonok, cosmonaut
Simon Kuznets
Seymour Lubetzky
Salomon Maimon, Jewish philosopher
Leonid Mandelstam, Jewish physicist
Mark Nemenman, Jewish computer scientist
Alexandre Okinczyc, doctor
Alexander S. Potupa
Francysk Skaryna
Spiridon Sobol, printer, educator and writer
Pavel Sukhoi
Branislau Tarashkevich
Immanuel Velikovsky
Lev Vygotsky
Oscar Zariski

Journalism
Veronika Cherkasova
Ihar Hermianchuk
Pavel Sheremet

Sports

Andrei Aramnau
Andrei Arlovski, former UFC Heavyweight Champion and MMA fighter
Vladimir and Alexander Artemev, father and son gymnasts
Anzhela Atroshchenko
Victoria Azarenka, tennis player
Benjamin Blumenfeld, chess player
Svetlana Boguinskaya
Pavel Bure, ice hockey player
Cypher, real name Alexey Yanushevsky, professional gamer
Darya Domracheva, biathlete, four-time Olympic champion
Yuri Foreman, middleweight and World Boxing Association super welterweight boxing champion
Leonid Geishtor, sprint canoer, Olympic champion Canadian pairs 1,000-meter
Boris Gelfand, chess player
Mikhail Grabovski, ice hockey player
Sergei Gurenko
Alexander Hleb, footballer
Alexey Ignashov, K1 Superstar
Maria Leontyavna Itkina, runner
Ekaterina Karsten
Olga Korbut
Andrei Kostitsyn, ice hockey player
Sergei Kostitsyn, ice hockey player
Abraham Kupchik, chess player
Vitali Kutuzov
Dmitri Markov
Vladimir Matyushenko, MMA fighter
Vladimir Samsonov, Table Tennis Player
Alexander Medved, weightlifter
Artem Milevskyi
Max Mirnyi, tennis player
Georgiy Monastyrskiy, footballer
Georgi Mondzolevski, Olympic and world champion volleyball player
Yulia Nesterenko, sprinter
Uladzimir Parfianovich
Evgenia Pavlina, rhythmic gymnast
Lev Polugaevsky, chess player
Yulia Raskina, Olympic silver medalist in rhythmic gymnastics
 Roman Rubinshteyn (born 1996), Belarusian-Israeli basketball player in the Israeli Basketball Premier League 
Andrei Rybakou
Ruslan Salei, ice hockey player
Vitaly Scherbo, artistic gymnast
Gennady Korotkevich, competitive programmer
Aryna Sabalenka, tennis player
Maria Sharapova, tennis player
Valery Shary, Olympic champion weightlifter (light-heavyweight)
Nadezhda Skardino, Olympic champion biathlete
Anna Smashnova (born 1976), Belarusian-born Israeli tennis player
Ilya Smirin, chess player
Roman Sorkin (born 1996), Israeli basketball player in the Israeli Basketball Premier League
Ivan Tikhon
 Veronika Vitenberg, Israeli Olympic rhythmic gymnast
Diana Vaisman, Belarusian-born Israeli sprinter
Alexandra Zaretski, ice dancer, Olympian
Roman Zaretski, ice dancer, Olympian
Ina Žukava, rhythmic gymnast
Natasha Zvereva, tennis player

Models
Janice Dickinson, American supermodel of Belarusian and Polish descent
Tanya Dziahileva, Belarusian model of Polish, Belarusian, and Ukrainian descent
Maryna Linchuk, Belarusian model of Russian descent, born in Minsk, Belarus

See also 

Belarus